Ape hybrid could refer to:

Koolakamba, legendary chimpanzee-gorilla hybrids
Bili ape, real-life ape with characteristics intermediate between chimpanzees and gorillas
Mangani, fictional ape with similar characteristics as the Bili ape from Tarzan
Hobo, a fictional chimpanzee-bonobo hybrid in the novel Wake
Humanzee, theoretical chimpanzee-human hybrid